The siglas poveiras ("signs of Póvoa"; also known as marcas) is a proto-writing system that has been used by the local community of Póvoa de Varzim in Portugal for many generations.

The siglas were primarily used as a signature for family coat-of-arms in order to mark family belongings. The symbols were normally written using a razor on wood, but painting on boats and beach sheds was also a common practice.

The purpose of the siglas was to record history and thus they have been ascribed as comprising Póvoa's "writing system". However, the siglas do not record sounds or specific words, and so are not considered true writing.

Types

Lixa Filgueiras argued that there are two types of symbols, distinguished by their use: the marcas (marks) and siglas. The marks served as a way to register ownership and thus were commonly present. The siglas, on the other hand, were used for magical and religious concerns. The siglas, being symbols of a mythical character, were thus rarer both in their ancient and newer forms.

Family marks

Siglas poveiras have been used for family coat-of-arms since time immemorial by Póvoa de Varzim community. Using these symbols, personal and fishing belongings were distinctly marked and thus a form of property registration. The "marca-brasão" ("blazon-mark") of a family was known within the entire Póvoa de Varzim community and children were recognized by counting the number of piques (similar to a traces) within their marks.

The usefulness of this system is noticed by its usage amongst merchants in their books of credit, and the siglas were read as we today read a name written in the Latin alphabet. Currency values were symbolized by rings and traces, drawn after the mark of an individual.

Nevertheless, it was on the tombs of the dead that the marks acquired a sense of personal significance. It became common and accepted to have one's mark carved onto one's tombstone.

According to a former port authority of Leixões, the Count of Vilas Boas, an individual stole a compass in Póvoa de Varzim and tried to sell it in Matosinhos, but he was unaware that the recorded "drawings" in the cover indicated the owner's name and thus the first person whom he approached (a woman from Póvoa de Varzim) managed to recognize the mark immediately. Summoning other fishermen, who also recognized the mark, the thief was apprehended and submitted to the port authority.

Inheritance 

The siglas are hereditary emblems (much like tamgas or Hausmarken), transmitted by inheritance from fathers to sons. These have unique symbolism and only the heirs are allowed to use them.

The siglas were not simply invented, but passed on through generations. The base family sigla was passed from the father to the youngest son — in Póvoa de Varzim’s tradition, the heir of the family is the youngest son — while the other children received the sigla with a trace (the pique).  Thus, the eldest son would have one pique, the second two and so on, so that the younger son that would have the original sigla, inheriting the same symbol as his father.

Analyses were made to check if families have actually used the same symbols throughout generations, due to some supposed inconsistencies within some families.  It became apparent that the inconsistencies had historical or genealogical motivations, and that these symbols were inherited through generations and preserved as part of Póvoa's local traditions. Hundreds of different marks were studied leading to 84 different original families.

Magical-religious marks

Chapels in beaches and hills

Important places for the study of Siglas Poveiras are the churches and religious sites located not only in the city and its rural environs, but also in all of the Northwest Iberian Peninsula, especially in the Minho region (in Portugal) and in Galicia.

The Poveiros over generations used to make inscriptions in the doors of chapels close to beaches or hills as a journey mark or as "campaign promises" (promessas de campanha). This has been observed in Nossa Senhora da Bonança at Esposende's beach, and Santa Trega at A Guarda Hill, Galicia. The mark inscribed would serve as a marker for the Poveiros that would come later, indicating either the passage of the inscriber or an attempt to procure good luck from the local venerated saint.

On September 23, 1991 a sculpture honouring the Siglas Poveiras was inaugurated at the festival of Santa Trega in Northwestern Spain, as a means to commemorate the old lost door of the Chapel of Santa Trega, which is known to be covered with Siglas Poveiras. After the inauguration, a fishing expedition aboard the Lancha Poveira Fé em Deus (Faith in God) arrived from Póvoa de Varzim, and the fishermen aboard went up to Santa Trega and prayed in the chapel dedicated to the patron saint of the hill. Hills close to the coast, being visible from sea, have always held an importance in the Poveiros sect traditions. Long ago, members of the fishing class would go up to this hill to pray to the saint, in a ritual with chants attempting to change the direction of the winds so that they could safely return home.

Siglas being used in much the same way can be found in the churches of Senhora da Abadia and São Bento da Porta Aberta, in Terras de Bouro, São Torcato, in Guimarães and Senhora da Guia, and in Vila do Conde. In the municipality of Póvoa de Varzim, these can also be found in the Chapel of Santa Cruz de Balasar.

Divisas

The caught fish in a boat’s net belonged to its owner, regardless of what position he held within the Lanchão or Sardinheiro castes. The fish caught was thus marked with the sigla and delivered to the fishing net owner. These fish marks are usually blows made in sigla form in different parts of the fish.

The crew of each boat also had a sigla that was used by all the members of the crew. In the case of a worker shifting to another boat, he would have to adopt the sigla of the new boat. These boat marks were known as "divisas".

The divisas are true "arms shields", intended for the boat’s recognition; curiously, however, they were different from the boat’s owner's mark. One should notice that all the Poveiro belongings were marked with his personal mark, except for the boat. This fact seems to indicate that the boats were predominantly subject to magical-religious invocations, often adopting a protecting-saint for the boat and thus earning a mythical character and also surrounded by protecting symbols.

Marriage marks
The Poveiros wrote their sigla in the table of the mother church upon marriage, as a way for recording the event. This usage of siglas can still be found in Igreja Matriz of Póvoa de Varzim (the mother church since 1757) and in Igreja da Lapa.

A table in the old Church of Misericórdia that had the function of a mother church until 1757 kept thousands of siglas, the obtainment of which would aid in a deeper study of the siglas poveiras, but these were destroyed when the church was demolished.

Origins
The siglas were first studied by António de Santos Graça in his book Epopeia dos Humildes ("The Odyssey of the Humble").  Published in 1952, the book contains hundreds of siglas and the history and maritime tragedy of Póvoa.  Other works of his are "O Poveiro" (The Poveiro, 1932), "A Crença do Poveiro nas Almas Penadas" (Poveiro Beliefs Regarding Dead Souls, 1933) e "Inscrições Tumulares por Siglas" (Tomb Inscriptions Using Siglas, 1942).

Although there are several opinions relating to their origin, it is generally accepted that the Siglas also known as Marcas, are Scandinavian. Based on numerous similarities initially found at the Nationalmuseet in Copenhagen, by Octávio Lixa Filgueiras, identified numerous objects marked with "home-marks" from Funen also known as Fyn in Denmark. Further studies proved that the complex hereditary mark system of Póvoa de Varzim was also found in Fyn, which given the geographical distance, historical Viking incursions in the Portuguese coastal areas, also pagan rituals in people from that particular fishing region, added to the belief of partial Norse ancestry and cultural legacy.

The Siglas or Marcas (Bomark) development is at least partly, attributed to the Norsemen that settled in the town during the 10th and 11th centuries. This form of primitive writing developed within the community of Póvoa de Varzim was kept due to the practice of endogamy. Also, the ‘marcas’ similarity with the Scandinavian tradition of using specific bomärken ("homestead marks") for signatures and for marking property is worthy of note. 

Each base sigla has a name, normally related with daily objects, but this sigla-object association occurred at a later date for both, Póvoa de Varzim and the system studied in the Danish region of Funnen. The hourglass of Funnen was drawn in the same way as the chalice of Póvoa de Varzim thus indicating that both are remnants of a later era.

Siglas have also been compared to runes, especially in the 1960s when Lixa Filgueiras called for further studies on the matter.

Comparing only identical Nordic runes:
 pique - i-rune isaz (ice)
 arpão (harpoon) - t-rune Tiwaz (Tyr)
 meio-arpão (half-harpoon) l-rune laguz (lake)
 cálix fechado (closed Chalice) - d-rune dagaz (day)
 cruz (cross) g-rune gyfu (gift)

According to Santos Graça, the siglas were inspired by daily objects of Póvoa de Varzim residents:
 lanchinha — Poveiro Boat (port)
 lanchinha — Poveiro Boat (nose)
 mastro e verga — Barco Poveiro with hoisted sail
 coice — Barco Poveiro (an area where women pushed for Ala-Arriba)
 padrão — Cruzeiro of the Cemetery of Póvoa de Varzim
  grades de dois e três piques — Gratings (Agricultural object used in the smoothing of the farm fields after harvest in Giesteira, Póvoa de Varzim)
   sarilho and meio sarilho — Sarilho (object used by women to make hanks of wool or hemp in Póvoa de Varzim)

Current use of Siglas

The use of the Latin alphabet to identify boats occurred only very recently in Póvoa de Varzim, when comparing with other fishing communities that used some kind of marks. In 1944, in a set of 25 boat marks, only one used the Latin Alphabet: F.A. de Francisco Fogateira, that substituted the marks: lanchinha and "double of two piques in cross and coice". In Aver-o-Mar, in a group of 38 boats, eight vessels already used the alphabet and marks.

Despite not having the use of previous periods, the ''banheiros of Bairro Norte district still place their family mark in their belonging at the beach, the same occurs in the family's home and the mark is written in the belongings. The Casa dos Pescadores da Póvoa de Varzim, the fishermen association, still accepts marks as correct forms of signature. Marks are also used to decorate the city, as in pavements. Street plates in the city center of Póvoa de Varzim use them to revive the use and as a local identity by placing several marks belonging to traditional Povoan families.

See also
 Pseudo-runes

References

External links

Families (part one)
Families (part two)
Abreviaturas, Acrónimos & Siglas
Siglas Poveiras - Câmara Municipal da Póvoa de Varzim
 - Glavendrup stone de Funen

Culture in Póvoa de Varzim
Proto-writing
Runiform scripts